M. Muthiah was an Indian politician and former Member of the Legislative Assembly. He was elected to the Tamil Nadu legislative assembly as Swatantra Party candidate from Ottapidaram constituency in 1967 election, Forward Bloc candidate  in 1971 election and as Dravida Munnetra Kazhagam candidate in 1989 election.

References 

Tamil Nadu politicians
Living people
Swatantra Party politicians
20th-century Indian politicians
Year of birth missing (living people)
Tamil Nadu MLAs 1967–1972
Tamil Nadu MLAs 1971–1976
Tamil Nadu MLAs 1989–1991
Dravida Munnetra Kazhagam politicians